Ralf Harolde (born Ralph Harold Wigger, May 17, 1899 – November 11, 1974) was an American character actor who often played gangsters. Between 1920 and 1963, he appeared in 99 films, including Smart Money with Edward G. Robinson and James Cagney, Jimmy the Gent with James Cagney and Bette Davis, Night Nurse with Barbara Stanwyck and Clark Gable, I'm No Angel with Mae West, Baby Take a Bow with Shirley Temple, A Tale of Two Cities with Ronald Colman, Our Relations with Laurel and Hardy, and Murder, My Sweet with Dick Powell.

Harolde was born in Pittsburgh, Pennsylvania and died in Santa Monica, California at age 75.

Selected filmography

 Headin' Home (1920) - John Tobin
 Sunshine Harbor (1922) - Billy Saunders
 Babe Comes Home (1927) - Baseball Fan (uncredited)
 Officer O'Brien (1930) - Mike Patello
 Framed (1930) - Chuck Gaines
 Young Desire (1930) - Blackie
 Dixiana (1930) - Royal Montague
 Check and Double Check (1930) - Ralph Crawford
 Hook, Line and Sinker (1930) - John Blackwell
 Smart Money (1931) - Sleepy Sam
 Night Nurse (1931) - Dr. Milton Ranger
 Alexander Hamilton (1931) - James Reynolds
 The Tip-Off (1931) - Nick Vatelli
 Are These Our Children? (1931) - Prosecutor (uncredited)
 Safe in Hell (1931) - Piet Van Saal
 The Secret Witness (1931) - Lewis Leroy
 Creation (1931) - Ned Hallet
 The Expert (1932) - Jim Crowley
 Play Girl (1932) - Willie (scenes deleted)
 Hollywood Speaks (1932) - Carp
 Winner Take All (1932) - Legs Davis - Diamond Ring Seller
 The Billion Dollar Scandal (1933) - Anderson (scenes deleted)
 Cheating Blondes (1933) - Lawson Rolt
 Picture Snatcher (1933) - Jerry
Her Resale Value (1933) - Sidney Fletcher
 Voltaire (1933) - Minor Role (uncredited)
 Deluge (1933) - Norwood
 I'm No Angel (1933) - Slick Wiley
 Night Flight (1933) - Pilot
 Jimmy the Gent (1934) - Hendrickson
 The Witching Hour (1934) - Frank Hardmuth
 He Was Her Man (1934) - Frank 'Red' Deering
 Baby Take a Bow (1934) - Trigger Stone
 Fifteen Wives (1934) - The Electric Voice
Once to Every Bachelor (1934) - Schuyler
 She Loves Me Not (1934) - J. B. Marshall
 Million Dollar Baby (1934) - Mac
 Sweepstake Annie (1935) - Hobart - Screenwriter (uncredited)
 The Perfect Clue (1935) - Sid Barkley
 Great God Gold (1935) - Frank Nitto
 Stolen Harmony (1935) - Dude Williams (uncredited)
 Silk Hat Kid (1935) - Lefty Phillips
 Woman Wanted (1935) - Monk Shelby (uncredited)
 Forced Landing (1935) - Burns
 A Tale of Two Cities (1935) - Prosecutor
 If You Could Only Cook (1935) - Swig
 My Marriage (1936) - Jones
 The Little Red Schoolhouse (1936) - Pete Scardoni
 Song and Dance Man (1936) - Crosby
 Human Cargo (1936) - Tony Sculla
 Our Relations (1936) - Gangster Boss
 15 Maiden Lane (1936) - Tony
 The Accusing Finger (1936) - 'Spud'
 A Man Betrayed (1936) - Tony Maroc
 Her Husband Lies (1937) - Steve Burdick
 The Last Train from Madrid (1937) - Spanish Man (uncredited)
 One Mile from Heaven (1937) - Moxie McGrath
 Conquest (1937) - Lejeune (uncredited)
 Undercover Agent (1939) - Bartel
 The Rookie Cop (1939) - Joey Anderman, Roadhouse Owner
 The San Francisco Docks (1940) - Hawks (uncredited)
 Lucky Devils (1941) - R. W. Ritter
 Ridin' on a Rainbow (1941) - Blake
 The Sea Wolf (1941) - Agent Getting Johnson Shanghaied (uncredited)
 Horror Island (1941) - Rod Grady
 Raiders of the Desert (1941) - Sheik Talifer
 Rags to Riches (1941) - Slip Conlan
 No Greater Sin (1941) - Nick Scaturo (uncredited)
 Bad Man of Deadwood (1941) - Jake Marvel
 The Stork Pays Off (1941) - 'Stud' Rocco
 I Killed That Man (1941) - Nick Ross
 Sealed Lips (1942) - Lips Haggarty
 Jail House Blues (1942) - Charlie, the Chopper (uncredited)
 Broadway (1942) - Dolph
 Gang Busters (1942, Serial) - Halliger
 Baby Face Morgan (1942) - Joe Torelli
 Sin Town (1942) - 'Kentucky'Jones
 Secret Service in Darkest Africa (1943, Serial) - Riverboat Captain [Ch. 1]
 A Lady Takes a Chance (1943) - Croupier (uncredited)
 Captain America (1943, Serial) - Tate - Apartment Thug [Ch. 2] (uncredited)
 Roger Touhy, Gangster (1944) - Prisoner (uncredited)
 Murder, My Sweet (1944) - Dr. Sonderborg
 The Phantom Speaks (1945) - Frankie Teal
 Mr. District Attorney (1947) - Mr. Marsden (uncredited)
 Backlash (1947) - X-Ray Technician (uncredited)
 Jewels of Brandenburg (1947) - Koslic
 Desperate (1947) - Walt's Doctor (uncredited)
 The Crimson Key (1947) - Gunman
 Assigned to Danger (1948) - Matty Farmer
 Hazard (1948) - Taxicab Driver
 Behind Locked Doors (1948) - Fred Hopps
 Alaska Patrol (1949) - Steele
 Killer Shark (1950) - Slattery
 The Rise and Fall of Legs Diamond (1960) - Doctor (uncredited)
 A New Kind of Love (1963) - French Waiter (uncredited)

External links

1899 births
1974 deaths
American male film actors
American male silent film actors
Deaths from pneumonia in California
Male actors from Pittsburgh
20th-century American male actors